Panchagavya or panchakavyam is a mixture used in traditional Hindu rituals that is prepared by mixing five ingredients. The three direct constituents are cow dung, urine, and milk; the two derived products are curd and ghee. These are mixed in proper ratio and then allowed to ferment. The Sanskrit word panchagavya means "five cow-derivatives". When used in Ayurvedic medicine, it is also called cowpathy.
Panchgavya is very useful to the farmers. And avoids harmful chemical fertilizers.

Efficacy
Proponents claim that cow urine therapy is capable of curing several diseases, including certain types of cancer, although these claims have no scientific backing. In fact, studies concerning ingesting individual components of panchagavya, such as cow urine, have shown no positive benefit, and significant side effects, including convulsion, depressed respiration, and death. Cow's urine can also be a source of harmful bacteria and infectious diseases, including leptospirosis.

Other applications
Panchgavya is also used as a fertilizer and pesticide in agricultural operations.  Proponents claim that it is a growth promoter in the poultry diet, that it is capable of increasing the growth of plankton for fish feed, and that it increases the production of milk in cows, increases the weight of pigs, and increases the egg laying capacity of poultry. It is sometimes used as a base in cosmetic products.

See also
 List of ineffective cancer treatments
 Traditional Knowledge Digital Library
 Urine therapy

References

Panchagavya

Agriculture in India
Animal products
Ayurvedic medicaments
Alternative cancer treatments
Pseudoscience